The 2022 Lindenwood football team represented Lindenwood University as a first-year member of the Ohio Valley Conference (OVC) in the 2022 NCAA Division I FCS football season. The Lions, led by fifth-year head coach Jed Stugart, played their home games at Harlen C. Hunter Stadium.

Lindenwood was ineligible for OVC title and FCS postseason play due to transition from NCAA Division II.

Previous season
The Lions finished the 2021 season with a record of 9–3, 7–0 GLVC play to win the GLVC championship. They received an at-large bid to the NCAA Division II championship where they lost in the first round to Grand Valley State.

Schedule

Source:

Game summaries

at Houston Baptist

Keiser

at No. 18 UT Martin

No. 24 Southeast Missouri State

at Central Arkansas

at Eastern Illinois

Murray State

William Jewell

at Tennessee Tech

McKendree

References

Lindenwood
Lindenwood Lions football seasons
Lindenwood Lions football